Thailand participated in the 1990 Asian Games in Beijing on 22 September to 7 October 1990. Thailand ended the games at 17 overall medals including 2 gold medals.

Nations at the 1990 Asian Games
1990
Asian Games